Vinyl Solution was a record label of the late 1980s and early 1990s, the offshoot of an independent London-based record store based at 231 Portobello Road (now known as Intoxica Records). The label signed many unconventional acts in a number of uncompromising genres, such as skatepunk thrash band The Stupids, Britcore rappers Gunshot, and Bomb Disneyland. The label had its biggest success when one of the label's techno-dance groups, Bizarre Inc, made the UK Singles Chart with the song "Playing with Knives".

Artists

Jonathan Saul Kane
Depth Charge's Jonathan Saul Kane was a key member in the organisation of the label, with a number of projects releasing discs on the label. In the mid 1990s he set up D.C. Recordings as a replacement for Vinyl Solution, with several other new offshoots catering for a number of subgenres in the dance music spectrum. The label's name was a pun on "The Final Solution", a Pere Ubu song.

Other artists

 Bizarre Inc
 Bolt Thrower
 The Bollweevils
 Bomb Disneyland/Bomb Everything
 Cancer
 Cerebral Fix
 Chemical People
 The Edsel Auctioneer
 Eon
 The Fell Downs
 Fudge Tunnel
 Gunshot
 The Hard-ons 
 Iowa Beef Experience 
 Les Thugs
 The Madeira Cakes
 Mega City Four
 Mercedes Valentino
 Red Rockers
Senseless Things
 Sink
 Soufflé With A Knife
 The Sound Asleep
 Spacemaggots
 The Stupids
 Testicular Warts
 The Venus Beads
 The Would Bes

See also
 List of record labels
 Visible Noise

References

External links
 Vinyl Solution Discog

Defunct record labels of the United Kingdom
Alternative rock record labels